Supreme Council of Physical Culture was created in Russia as a consultation body for the Vsevobuch and existed from August 1920 to June 1936. It was a predecessor of the State Sports Committee of the USSR.

Brief outline
In 1923 the council was reassigned as a standing committee to the All-Russian Central Executive Committee and was created with central executive committees of other republics of the Soviet Union. In 1930 such a council was created at the Central Executive Committee of the Soviet Union.

In 1931 there was introduced by OSOAVIAKHIM the first training programme Ready for Labour and Defence of the USSR. In 1935 it led to development of the Unified Sports Classification System of the USSR.

In 1933 there was established the Central science research institute of physical culture.

Sections
 Football (1934)
 Chess and checkers
 Shooting
 Tennis (1929)
 Rugby (1935)
 Volleyball (1932)
 Gymnastics (1930)
 Powerboating
 Methods of Defense, Attack and Weightlifting
 Boxing (1935)
 Sailing (1936)
 Tourism (1936)

Chairmen
 1920 - 1923 Nikolai Podvoisky
 1923 - 1926 Nikolai Semashko
 1926 - 1930 Vasiliy Mikhailov
 1930 - 1934 Nikolay Antipov
 1934 - 1936 Vasiliy Mantsev

See also
 Vsevobuch

References

External links
 USSR. Physical culture and sports. Great Soviet Encyclopedia.
 Resolution of Sovnarkom of the RSFSR. 1930-09-20.
 History on establishing the council
 History on establishing sports governing bodies in the USSR.
 Central museum of physical culture and sports

1920 establishments in Russia
1936 disestablishments in the Soviet Union
1930 establishments in the Soviet Union
Sports governing bodies in the Soviet Union